Year of Freedom. Mariupol After DNR is a short documentary produced by Public TV of Azov and released on 13 June 2015 - one year after Mariupol was recaptured by the Ukrainian government from pro-Russian separatist of the so-called Donetsk People's Republic. The film describes the events that took place in the port city of Mariupol in south-eastern Ukraine in the summer of 2014. The story of the liberation of Mariupol on 13 June 2014, is told by participants of the operation - from a regular soldier to the President of Ukraine.

Cast 
 Petro Poroshenko - President of Ukraine;
 Andriy Biletsky - chief of Azov Battalion;
 Volodymyr Bohonis - chief of staff of Dnipro-1 Regiment;
 Call sign "Prapor" - soldier of Dnipro-1 Regiment.

Reception 
The documentary became one of the most popular videos of Public TV of Azov reaching near 200,000 views. It was awarded as a "Best documentary" at the 2016 film festival "KiTy". The website "To Inform is to Influence" describes events shown in this documentary as a "proof of the fact that DNR rebels are untrained".

See also 
 The city of the heroes
 Winter that changed us

External links 
 
 Year of freedom. Mariupol after DNR on the official Public TV of Azov website.

References 

2015 short documentary films
Ukrainian short documentary films
Films about Mariupol
Documentary films about war
War in Donbas films
2015 films